The Taliaferro House, at 106 Cedar St. in Rock Springs, Wyoming, was built in c. 1907–1912.  It was listed on the National Register of Historic Places on March 31, 1998;  the listing included two contributing buildings.

References

External links
 Taliaferro House at the Wyoming State Historic Preservation Office

Houses on the National Register of Historic Places in Wyoming
Houses completed in 1907
Buildings and structures in Rock Springs, Wyoming
Houses in Sweetwater County, Wyoming
National Register of Historic Places in Sweetwater County, Wyoming
1907 establishments in Wyoming